BRP Ang Pangulo (AT-25) is a presidential yacht that was acquired by the Philippine government in 1959. The yacht was first used by President Carlos P. Garcia.

Specifications
The BRP Ang Pangulo was built by the Japanese yacht-building company Ishikawajima-Harima Heavy Industries.

History

Garcia administration 
RPS Lapu-Lapu (PY-77) was built in Japan as part of that country's war reparations to the Philippines. At the initiative of President Carlos P. Garcia, Filipino naval engineers specifically designed the vessel for use as a presidential yacht. It was christened with its original name of RPS Lapu-Lapu, named after the Visayan datu, Lapulapu, and commissioned into the Philippine Navy on March 7, 1959, as its flagship, a status it held until December 1961.

Macapagal administration 
President Diosdado Macapagal in the following year ordered its conversion to a naval troop transport, renaming it RPS Roxas after the fifth President of the Philippines, Manuel Roxas, in rites led by his widow, Trinidad Roxas.

President Diosdado Macapagal himself used another, older, presidential yacht, the RPS Santa Maria, which he renamed RPS Pag-Asa, the name by which it had also been called a decade earlier under President Ramon Magsaysay. This ship was later decommissioned by the Navy in 1993.

Marcos administration 
Later the vessel was renamed RPS The President and then BRP Ang Pangulo (TP-777) by President Ferdinand E. Marcos, who restored its use as the presidential yacht, a status it has retained in all succeeding presidencies to the present day.

After 1986 it became associated with the lavish activities of the Marcos family when the video archives of Malacañang Palace were revealed to the public.  Among the videos released was Irene Marcos' lavish September 1985 party aboard the Ang Pangulo, which was controversial in light of the sorry state of the Philippine economy at the time, and because diplomats such as U.S. Ambassador Stephen W. Bosworth were shown participating in an event which put the profligacy of the Marcos administration on display.

Arroyo administration 
It is in honor of these earlier periods under Presidents Magsaysay and Macapagal, and to emphasize its service to the people throughout the archipelago, that the BRP Ang Pangulo was renamed BRP Pag-Asa by President Gloria Macapagal Arroyo.

As it has throughout the Arroyo administration and over its 50-year life, the vessel, operated by Naval Taskforce “Sealion”, continues at the President's instruction to carry out relief and medical missions all over the islands, aid in emergency search and rescue efforts, perform naval functions, promote tourism, culture and local products, as well as serve the presidency and the government.

Duterte administration 
On May 15, 2016, presumptive president-elect Rodrigo Duterte announced his plans to sell the ship. Duterte said that the proceeds would go to war veterans, improvement of hospital facilities, and salaries for doctors "so they would not have to leave the country for higher-paying jobs." However, after being told of the process for disposing of government and military assets by Armed Forces of the Philippines spokesperson Restituto Padilla, Duterte said that he instead plans to convert the ship into a hospital ship in the event of a conflict.

Covid-19 response 
On April 3, 2020, Duterte ordered the conversion of the ship to accommodate COVID-19 patients. The yacht was used as a 28-bed capacity isolation facility for military frontline workers during the COVID-19 pandemic.

On April 30, 2021, the Philippine Navy (PN) has announced that the BRP Ang Pangulo is prepared to admit coronavirus patients. The ship is docked at Pier 13, Manila South Harbor.

As of January 22, 2022, the Philippine Navy announced that the Ship was able to extend Medical Aid to a total of 2,450 Patients in Siargao and the Dinagat Islands as part of its Humanitarian Missions in the Area

Description
BRP Ang Pangulo was one of 15 ocean-going vessels provided by the Government of Japan as part of war reparations to the Republic of the Philippines during the administration of President Carlos P. Garcia. First called Bow No. 77, it was designed as the Presidential Yacht by Filipino naval engineers and built at the Ishikawajima Dry-Docks in Tokyo.

Its keel was laid at the Harume Yard on July 16, 1958, and the vessel was launched on October 16 of that year. Sea trials were conducted under Lieutenant Commander Manuel Mandapat PN, its first commanding officer, on February 9 and 10, 1959. It was designated as the flagship of the Philippine Navy by President Garcia through an Executive Order on February 13, 1959, and delivered to the Philippine Government on February 28. It was christened RPS Lapu-Lapu (PY-77) and commissioned into the Philippine Navy on March 7. On April 2, the vessel arrived in Manila.

The first presidential engagement held aboard took place on April 7, 1959, and the ship's first mission, a trade and cultural floating exposition with ports of call in Vietnam, Thailand, Singapore, Indonesia, Hong Kong, Japan, South Korea, and Taiwan, was carried out from April 19 to June 4, 1959. The vessel has since been extensively used for relief, emergency search and rescue, patrol, auxiliary transport and command vessel purposes in addition to performing its duties to the presidency and the government. Many distinguished persons, including General Douglas MacArthur on his sentimental journey in 1961, and numerous heads of state and government, have been aboard as official guests.

Flagship status was revoked by President Diosdado Macapagal on December 31, 1961, and the vessel was renamed RPS Roxas (TP-71) on October 9, 1962, the first instance of a naval ship being named in honor of a Philippine president. It was renamed RPS The President (TP-777) by President Ferdinand E. Marcos on January 11, 1967, and renamed anew as BRP Ang Pangulo (TP-777) on July 1, 1971. Its hull number was altered to AT-25 by President Corazon C. Aquino on September 24, 1986. From 1998 to 2000, extensive refurbishment took place under President Joseph Ejercito Estrada.

On March 6, 2009, the eve of its 50th commissioning anniversary, the ship was renamed BRP Pag-Asa (AT-25) by President Gloria Macapagal Arroyo in fitting ceremonies celebrating an outstanding legacy of service to the Republic.

On December 14, 2011, during ceremonies coinciding commission 2 newly acquired navy ships and a helicopter, the ship was renamed again as BRP Ang Pangulo (AT-25) "to continue the heritage and carry the honor and prestige of the Philippine presidency.”

Previous presidential yachts

The Apo
It was a steam yacht built in Kinghorn, Scotland, in 1898. It was initially called the Cem but was later on renamed to The Amelia III after it was acquired by King Carlos of Portugal. In 1906, it was purchased by Henry Clay Pierce, and the name was changed to the Yacona.
It was acquired by the United States Navy and commissioned in 1917. After it was decommissioned at Engineer Island, Manila, in 1921, it was transferred to the Philippine Insular Government and renamed Apo. In 1932, it was returned to the United States Federal Government.

The Cassiana/Banahaw
The Cassandra, an oil-burning yacht, was built in 1908. It was acquired by oil tycoon Edward L. Doheny and renamed the Casiana, after his first major oil well in Mexico.
In 1936, the Commonwealth government acquired it for $50,000, and the ship arrived in Manila on November 25 of the same year. The name was changed to Banahaw, and it was made part of the Coast Guard service, although, primarily, it was reserved for use of the President and his family.
On December 29, 1941, it sank off Fort Mills wharf, Corregidor, by Japanese bombing.

The Orchid
It was a 190-foot Manzanita Class vessel built in New Jersey. Its keel was laid in October 1907; it was launched in May 1908, and was commissioned in August 1908 to the United States Lighthouse Service, which was merged with the Coast Guard in 1939. It was called the Orchid in line with the Lighthouse Service's tradition of using flora as names for certain vessels (tenders, in particular), which was continued by the Coast Guard.
With its sister ships, the Anemone, Sequoia, and the Tulip, the Orchid was transferred to the Philippines when it was decommissioned in December 1945. It was used by President Manuel Roxas.

The Apo II
It was an Admirable-class minesweeper laid down on November 24, 1943, by the Gulf Shipbuilding Corporation in Alabama. On March 16, 1944, it was launched, and on October 25, 1944, was commissioned as the USS Quest (AM-281). She received two battle stars during World War II. It was decommissioned on May 2, 1946, and struck from the Navy register on September 29, 1947.
It was renamed Dalisay when it was transferred to the Republic of the Philippines on July 2, 1948. It was then renamed Pagasa, by President Ramon Magsaysay, and again to Santa Maria by President Carlos P. Garcia, after his hometown.
In 1959, it was replaced by the new presidential yacht, the Lapu-Lapu, but continued to serve as the alternate yacht.
With the designation TK-21, it was renamed three times by President Diosdado Macapagal as the Corregidor (1963), Pagasa (1964), and Incorruptible (1965). However, the name was reverted to Pag-Asa (1966) and finally changed to Mount Samat by President Ferdinand E. Marcos in 1967.
The ship was decommissioned on September 21, 1993, and sunk off Sangley Point.

References 

Auxiliary ships of the Philippine Navy
1958 ships
Motor yachts
Presidential yachts of the Philippines
Hospital ships involved in the COVID-19 pandemic
Ships built by IHI Corporation